Michael-James Olsen (born 1994) is an Australian/American film actor.

Career
Michael-James Olsen began his career by playing the young Victor Creed in the X-Men film X-Men Origins: Wolverine which was released worldwide on May 1, 2009.

Skills
Olsen is an experienced surfer, and trained in bō staff and sword fighting. He also plays guitar and piano.

Filmography
 Last Chance Holiday (2013)
 Kristin's Christmas Past (2013)
 Grey's Anatomy (2013)
 X-Men Origins: Wolverine (2009) as Young Victor Creed

References

External links

American male child actors
American male film actors
Australian male child actors
Australian male film actors
Living people
1994 births